Jindřich Roudný (14 February 1924 – 10 May 2015) was a Czech athlete who competed in the 1952 Summer Olympics. He was born in Fukov.

References

1924 births
2015 deaths
Czech male steeplechase runners
Olympic athletes of Czechoslovakia
Athletes (track and field) at the 1952 Summer Olympics
European Athletics Championships medalists